The My Love Is Your Love World Tour (advertised as World Tour 1999) was the eighth concert tour by American recording artist Whitney Houston. The tour was in support of her fourth album, My Love Is Your Love (1998). Beginning in the summer of 1999, the tour played over 60 shows in Europe and North America. The tour marked Houston's final concert appearances in North America.

Background
After My Love is Your Love—Houston's first studio album in eight years—was released, the singer embarked on her first world tour since 1994 to promote it. For the North American leg of the tour, Houston turned down most arena dates in favor of theaters because she wanted "to do something where people can feel [her] and [she] can feel them." Performing in theaters allowed Houston's shows to have a jam-session atmosphere. Since theaters have lower capacities than arenas, Houston played in most North American cities for two nights each.

Houston signed a deal with Dolce & Gabbana to design all of her clothes for the tour. This deal gave Houston a more hip and contemporary look to match her music; this look contrasted with her previous tours. Houston first showcased her new wardrobe on The Oprah Winfrey Show prior to the tour opener in Chicago.

In July, Houston made a surprise appearance at the 13th Annual New York City Lesbian and Gay Pride Dance. At the event, the singer gave a rare performance of the popular remixes to "It's Not Right But It's OK" and "Heartbreak Hotel".

Controversy arose during the North American leg of the tour. There were reports of strange and erratic behavior behind the scenes. Houston cancelled some concert dates, including two shows in her hometown of Newark, New Jersey. The singer pulled out of her San Francisco show at the Concord Pavilion 15 minutes before it was scheduled to begin; the city demanded $100,000 in compensation after public outcry. Houston blamed all the cancellations on an ongoing throat ailment. Still, these actions would further spark drug use rumours in the tabloids.

The tour was successful. The concerts featured Houston's highest ticket prices. With many shows, Houston commanded up to $150 for a ticket, making her just one of a few artists to break the $100-per-ticket barrier.

The tour was an even bigger success in Europe. It was the highest grossing European arena concert tour of the year, playing to almost half a million people. Every date was sold out in advance. As a result, the tour was extended to November due to high demand.

During the European leg of the tour, DoRo Productions—a film company based in Vienna, Austria—filmed and produced a documentary of the tour titled "Whitney – Close Up". The documentary showcased behind-the-scenes footage, rehearsals and live performances throughout Europe. Close Up was originally set to be aired as a TV special in the spring of 2000 following the release of Whitney: The Greatest Hits, but didn't air at the time. Some footage from Close Up was also used in the documentary Whitney: Can I Be Me.

A similar but different documentary, also titled Close Up was broadcast on February 11, 2018 on the German TV channel ServusTV.

Opening acts
 112 
 Amanda Marshall 
 Mark Curran

Setlist

Additional notes
"My Love Is Your Love" and "Step by Step" was performed as encores in Chicago, replacing "It's Not Right But It's Okay" performed earlier in the show.
"Abraham, Martin and John" was performed in Denver on July 26, and Los Angeles on July 30, as a tribute to the late John F. Kennedy, Jr. 
Houston performed "You'll Never Stand Alone" in London on September 18, "All at Once" in Rotterdam on October 12, "Greatest Love of All" in Antwerp on November 2, and "Home" in London on November 8.
"Exhale (Shoop Shoop)" and "Amazing Grace" was performed at select dates in Europe. "(You Make Me Feel Like A) Natural Woman" by Aretha Franklin was performed in Frankfurt on October 18, and a medley of Dionne Warwick's "Walk On By" and "Alfie" was performed in Oberhausen on October 30.

Shows

Festivals and other miscellaneous performances
This concert is a part of the "Sopot International Song Festival"
This concert is a part of "Stoppelmarkt"
This concert is a part of the "Open-Air-Wochenende"

Cancellations and rescheduled shows

Personnel
Band
Musical Director – Michael Baker
Drums – Michael Baker
Bass guitar – Alex Evans
Keyboards – Jetro Da Silva
Percussion – Taku Hirano
Guitar – John "Jubu" Smith
Piano – Myron McKinley
Background vocalists – Gary Houston, Valerie Pinkston, Sharlotte Gibson, Cindy Mizelle
Dancers
Carolyn Brown, Kyndra Reevey, Merylin Mitchell, Joyce Vanhook
Tour Management
Manager – Tony Bulluck
Security
Director of Security – Alan Jacobs

Broadcasting and recordings
 Houston's concert on August 22, in Sopot, Poland was televised on Germany, United Kingdom and Poland cable TV.
 Live performances of "I Learned From the Best" was televised during UNCF benefit telethon broadcast, and "It's Not Right But Its Okay" performance was aired on the MTV series All Access Live.

References

External links
 my love is your love tour - whitneyhouston

1999 concert tours
Whitney Houston concert tours